Jonathan Ray Scott (born January 10, 1983) is a former American football offensive tackle. He played college football for the University of Texas, and was recognized as a unanimous All-American. He was drafted by the Detroit Lions in the fifth round of the 2006 NFL Draft, and has also played for the Buffalo Bills and Pittsburgh Steelers.

Early years
Scott was born in Dallas, Texas.  He attended David W. Carter High School in Dallas, where he was a three-sport athlete.  While in high school, Scott played in the first-ever U.S. Army All-American Bowl on December 30, 2000.

College career
Scott enrolled in the University of Texas, where he played for coach Mack Brown's Texas Longhorns football team from 2002 to 2005.  While attending Texas, he was initiated as a member of the Eta Theta chapter of Omega Psi Phi fraternity.  He was a first-team All-Big 12 selection at offensive tackle in 2004.  Following his senior season in 2005, he was a first-team All-Big 12 selection again, and was recognized as a unanimous first-team All-American.  Scott was a member of the 2005 Longhorns team that defeated the USC Trojans 41–38 in the Rose Bowl to win the BCS National Championship.

Professional career

Detroit Lions
Scott was drafted by the Detroit Lions in the fifth round of the 2006 NFL Draft. He was waived by the Lions during final cuts on August 30, 2008.

Buffalo Bills
Scott was signed by the Buffalo Bills on December 18, 2008.

Pittsburgh Steelers
On March 8, 2010, Scott agreed to a contract with the Pittsburgh Steelers.  On July 29, 2011, Scott re-signed with the Steelers on a one-year deal. He was released by the Steelers on July 19, 2012. At the end of the 2010 season, Scott and the Steelers appeared in Super Bowl XLV. He was a starter in the 31–25 loss to the Green Bay Packers.

Detroit Lions (second stint)
Scott signed with the Detroit Lions again on July 24, 2012, and was subsequently released again in late August after being placed on injured reserve.

Chicago Bears
Scott was picked up by the Chicago Bears on September 10, 2012. Chicago acquired Scott after first conducting a workout with Scott on September 1, 2012. After Gabe Carimi was benched, Scott replaced him. After becoming an unrestricted free agent in 2013, on March 25, Scott signed a one-year deal to stay with the Bears. On September 4, 2013, Scott was released, but was re-signed on September 9.

Atlanta Falcons
He signed with Atlanta after Peter Konz was placed on injured reserve.

Personal life
His father, Ray Scott, was a defensive lineman and tight end at Prairie View A&M and was drafted by the New York Jets in the ninth round of the 1967 NFL Draft.

References

External links
 Detroit Lions bio
 Pittsburgh Steelers bio
 Buffalo Bills bio
 Chicago Bears bio

1983 births
Living people
All-American college football players
American football offensive tackles
Atlanta Falcons players
Buffalo Bills players
Chicago Bears players
Detroit Lions players
Pittsburgh Steelers players
Players of American football from Dallas
Texas Longhorns football players